Phyllis Rappeport (19 February 1929 – 9 January 2020) was an American pianist and teacher at Western Michigan University.

References 
 90th birthday celebrated; accessed 29 Jan 2020
 Interview; accessed 29 Jan 2020
 Obituary; accessed 29 Jan 2020
 Entry on University web site; accessed 29 Jan 2020
 kalamazooarts.org; accessed 29 Jan 2020

1929 births
2020 deaths
American women pianists
Western Michigan University faculty
Musicians from New York City
21st-century American women musicians